Kelly Basin is a bay on the south eastern side of Macquarie Harbour on the West Coast of Tasmania.

It was named after James Kelly an early explorer of the Tasmanian coastline.

It was the location of the terminus of the North Mount Lyell Railway, and the ghost town of Pillinger.

In the late 1890s when John Watt Beattie was showing his photographs of the west coast country to Hobart and Launceston audiences, it was designated as Kelly's Basin.

The North Mount Lyell Railway close in the 1920s, and the former railway formation - known as 'Kelly Basin Road' was the land route to access the area.

In the 1990s following the failure of the Franklin Dam project to proceed - parts of the Kelly Basin and Bird River area became part of reserves associated with the western boundary of the new South West World Heritage Wilderness area.

In the Southwest National Park, and as part of the body of water known as Port Davey, is a feature with a very similar name of James Kelly Basin

References

Further reading
 
 
 Whitham, Charles. Western Tasmania: A Land of Riches and Beauty.

Bays of Tasmania
Macquarie Harbour
Mount Lyell Mining and Railway Company
North Mount Lyell Railway